Professor Frederick Lindemann, Baron Cherwell, the British government's chief scientific adviser, sent on 30 March 1942 to British Prime Minister  Winston Churchill a memorandum which, after it was accepted by the Cabinet, became known as the dehousing paper.

The paper was delivered during a debate within the British government about the most effective use of the nation's resources in waging war on Germany: whether the Royal Air Force (RAF) should be reduced to allow more resources to go to the British Army and Royal Navy, or the strategic bombing option should be followed and expanded. The paper argued that from the analysis of the reaction of the British population to the Blitz, the demolition of people's houses was the most effective way to affect their morale, even more than killing relatives. The known limits of the RAF in locating targets in Germany and in providing the planned resources to be available to the RAF made destroying about 30% of the housing stock of Germany's 58 largest towns the most effective use of the aircraft of RAF Bomber Command by breaking the Germans' spirit. After a heated debate by the government's military and scientific advisers, the Cabinet chose the strategic bombing campaign over all other options.

Production and contents of dehousing paper
The dehousing paper came while Bomber Command was in an enforced period of much reduced bombing. The Butt Report had shown that bombing results were poor, and with the attrition rate it had been suffering in operations, the effort that had been expended gave a poor return. Since November 1941, the RAF had been husbanding its resources and awaiting the introduction of large numbers of four-engined heavy bombers and the GEE radio-navigational device into frontline service.

The bombing policy had already moved away from attempts at precision bombing.

The paper was produced by Cherwell by using an analysis of recent raids on British cities that were being undertaken. The information was given by the researchers in response to questions posed by Cherwell.

Contemporary debate and Butt and Singleton reports

The dehousing paper had been delivered to Churchill at a time of mounting criticism about the RAF Bomber offensive. Criticism was coming from other branches inside the War ministry and was becoming public.

It had started with a report initiated by Cherwell and delivered on 18 August 1941 by D. M. Bensusan-Butt, a member of the War Cabinet Secretariat. The report based on analysis of aerial photographs concluded that less than a third of sorties flown had gotten within  of the target. As Bensusan-Butt did not include aircraft that did not bomb because of equipment failure, enemy action, weather or getting lost, the reality was that about 5% of bombers setting out bombed within five miles of their target.

Senior RAF commanders argued that the Butt report's statistics were faulty and commissioned another report, which was delivered by the Directorate of Bombing Operations on 22 September 1941. Working from a damage analysis inflicted on British cities, a bomber force of 4,000 aircraft was calculated to be able to destroy the 43 German towns with a population of more than 100,000. The Chief of the Air Staff, Sir Charles Portal argued that with such a force RAF Bomber Command could win the war in six months. Not all were convinced, and when Churchill expressed his doubts, the Air Staff said that even if Germany was not knocked out of the war, it would be weakened sufficiently to allow British armed forces back into Continental Europe. With that compromise between the armed services, Bomber Command was allowed to keep its planned allocation of war materiel. That did not stop those outside the Chiefs of Staff from questioning the strategic bombing policy.

A particularly-damning speech had been delivered in the British House of Commons by the Member of Parliament for the University of Cambridge, Professor A. V. Hill who pointed out, "The total [British] casualties in air-raids – in killed – since the beginning of the war are only two-thirds of those we lost as prisoners of war at Singapore.... The loss of production in the worst month of the Blitz was about equal to that due to the Easter holidays.... The Air Ministry have been... too optimistic.... We know most of the bombs we drop hit nothing of importance". Thus, the Secretary of State for Air, Sir Archibald Sinclair and Sir Charles Portal were delighted by the dehousing paper, as it offered support to them in their battle to save the strategic bomber offensive, which had been under attack from others in the high command, who thought that the resources put into Bomber Command were damaging the other branches of the armed services with little to show for it. Portal and Sinclair still expressed their reservations that it could be met.

On reading the dehousing paper, Professor Patrick Blackett, the newly-appointed civilian Director of Naval Operational Research,  wrote that the paper's estimate of what could be achieved was 600% too high. The principal advocate for the reduction of RAF Bomber Command in favour of other options was Sir Henry Tizard. He argued that the only benefit to strategic bombing was to tie up enemy resources defending Germany and that they could be tied up with a far smaller bombing offensive. He wrote to Cherwell on 15 April to query the facts in the paper and warned that the War Cabinet could reach the wrong decision if it based it on the paper. Tizard had several doubts: that the stated size bomber force could be achieved with only 7,000 bombers, not the 10,000 expected; that new navigational aids that would get the aircraft to the targets would not be ready before 1943; and that it was unlikely that more than 25% of the bombs would land on target. As such, the strategy would not work with the resources available, and a far larger effort would be required. In reply to Tizard, Cherwell stated the calculations were for the Prime Minister's benefit, not for statistical analysis, and that despite a difference between the numbers and what was really achieved, there would be catastrophic effects. In his Bomber Command, Max Hastings characterised the debate between the two sides as not being whether bombing could "raze [Germany] to the ground" but whether it was the most effective allocation of resources.

Mr. Justice Singleton, a High Court judge, was asked by the Cabinet to look into the competing points of view. In his report, delivered on 20 May 1942 he concluded:

In the end, thanks in part to the dehousing paper, it was this view which prevailed, but C. P. Snow (later Lord Snow) wrote that the debate became quite vitriolic, with Tizard being called a defeatist. It was while the debate about bombing was raging inside the British military establishment that the area bombing directive of 14 February 1942 was issued, and eight days later , Arthur "Bomber" Harris took up the post of Air Officer Commanding (AOC) of Bomber Command.

The study of the effects of bombing on Hull and Birmingham was published on 8 April by Professors Bernal and Zuckerman after Cherwell's paper had been presented. Their work, the "Hull and Birmingham Survey", had actually found that although there was anxiety as a result of the raids, there was no mass anti-social behaviour and "no measurable effect on the health of either town".

Notes

References

Sources

Further reading

World War II strategic bombing
1942 in the United Kingdom
Military history of the United Kingdom during World War II
1942 documents